Adrianne Todman is an American government official who has served as the deputy secretary of housing and urban development in the Biden administration since June 2021. Todman was previously the CEO of the National Association of Housing and Redevelopment Officials and also worked in the Department of Housing and Urban Development.

Early life and education 
Todman was born and raised in the United States Virgin Islands. She graduated from Smith College in 1991.

Career 
Todman worked as a legislative director for Congressman Ron de Lugo. She later joined the United States Department of Housing and Urban Development, where she worked as a policy aide in the Office of Public and Indian Housing and office of the director. Todman later worked as the executive director of the District of Columbia Housing Authority. In 2017, she was selected as the CEO of the National Association of Housing and Redevelopment Officials.

On June 10, 2021, her nomination to serve as United States Deputy Secretary of Housing and Urban Development was confirmed by the US Senate with unanimous consent. She was sworn in by Secretary Marcia Fudge on June 14.

References 

Living people
Smith College alumni
Biden administration personnel
United States Deputy Secretaries of Housing and Urban Development
United States Virgin Islands people
Year of birth missing (living people)